James Dafforne (29 April 1804  – 5 June 1880) was a British journalist, known for his art criticism in The Art Journal.

Life
He was for 35 years a contributor to The Art Journal, joining the staff in 1845, and writing for it till his death. He died on 5 June 1880 at the house of his son-in-law, the Rev. C. E. Casher, Upper Tooting.

Works
Dafforne's works were mostly compilations from the Journal: Pictures of Daniel Maclise, R.A.; also the Pictures of William Mulready, of Leslie and Maclise, of Clarkson Stanfield, R.A., Sir Edwin Landseer, and others. He compiled the Pictorial Table-book. In 1878 he published a book on the Albert Memorial. In 1879 his final book appeared, The Life and Works of Edward Matthew Ward, R.A. He translated Arts of the Middle Ages, by De la Croix.

British Artists: Their Style and Character
A long series of illustrated critical essays by Dafforne appeared in The Art Journal under this title.

From 1873 Dafforne continued to write British Artists essays:

References

Notes

External links

Online Books page

Attribution

1804 births
1880 deaths
English male journalists
English art critics
English male non-fiction writers